Daxiatitan (meaning "Daxia giant" after a tributary of the Yellow River) is a genus of sauropod dinosaur known from the Lower Cretaceous of Gansu, China. Its type and only species is Daxiatitan binglingi. It is known from a single partial skeleton consisting of most of the neck and back vertebrae, two tail vertebrae, a shoulder blade, and a thigh bone. At the time of its discovery in 2008, Daxiatitan was regarded as potentially the largest known dinosaur from China.

Taxonomy

Daxiatitan and its type and only species Daxiatitan binglingi were named by You Hailu, Li Daqing, Zhou Lingqi, and Ji Qiang in 2008. The holotype of D. binglingi, GSLTZP03-001, was collected from the Hekou Group, in Gansu Province, and consists of ten cervical, ten dorsal, and two caudal vertebrae, cervical and dorsal ribs, a haemal arch, a scapulocoracoid, and a femur.

The genus name refers to the Daxia River, a tributary of the Yellow River that runs through the area where the type specimen was found, and the species name refers to Bingling Temple, which is located in the region.

Daxiatitan was initially described as a basal titanosaur, and most subsequent studies have regarded it as a basal titanosaur or as a somphospondylan close to Titanosauria in Euhelopodidae. In 2020, a phylogenetic analysis conducted by Moore et al. found that Daxiatitan and Euhelopus may form a clade with mamenchisaurids.

Description 
 
Daxiatitan was an exceptionally large dinosaur, among the largest known from China.

Like both Euhelopus and Huanghetitan, it had an enormously long neck.

Footnotes

References

Early Cretaceous dinosaurs of Asia
Titanosaurs
Fossil taxa described in 2008
Paleontology in Gansu